Saint Theobald may refer to:

Theobald of Dorat (990–1070), French saint
Theobald of Provins (1017–1066), hermit
Theobald of Marly (died 1247), Cistercian
Teobaldo Roggeri (Saint Theobald, 1100–1150), Italian

See also
Saint-Thibault (disambiguation)